Dupont Circle station is an underground rapid transit station on the Red Line of the Washington Metro in Washington, D.C. Located below the circle of the same name, it is one of the busiest stations in the Metro system, with an average of 16,948 entries each weekday. The station parallels Connecticut Avenue NW between the southern edge of the circle to the south and Q Street NW to the north.

Station layout 
Dupont Circle station has two tracks with side platforms, one of the only Red Line stations with this setup. This single-bore layout is required by its deep passage beneath the Connecticut Avenue NW underpass and an abandoned streetcar tunnel, now used as an art space. The station's depth required construction using rock-tunneling methods.

There are two entrances to the station. The north entrance, on the southeast corner of Q Street NW and 20th Street NW contains a set of three escalators and an elevator to reach a mezzanine and fare control at the north end of the station. Unique to the station, the edges of the escalators are trellised with plants where normally there would be granite slabs. The south entrance, located on the southern edge of Dupont Circle at 19th Street NW and Connecticut Avenue NW, has another set of three escalators to reach a separate mezzanine and fare control at the south end of the platforms.

History

Dupont Circle station opened on January 17, 1977, the first to open after the original stretch of the Red Line between Union Station and Farragut North. It remained the western terminus of the Red Line until December 5, 1981, upon the extension of the line to Van Ness–UDC.

On May 6, 2000, a woman fell between the tracks but was unharmed as the train passed over her. The station was temporarily closed and the woman was extracted from under the train as power had been shut off. In May 2006, a Metro employee died after being struck by a train in the station.

In 2007, a portion of Walt Whitman's 1865 poem The Wound Dresser was inscribed into the granite wall around the north entrance escalators to honor the city's caregivers during the HIV crisis.

The south entrance was closed from February 1 to October 21, 2012, to replace all three escalators, deemed among the system's least reliable.

On January 15, 2018, a train headed to Glenmont derailed outside the station. Nobody was seriously hurt.

In April 2019, construction began on a station canopy for the north entrance, identical to other canopies across the system. Construction is completed in summer 2022. However, construction was delayed due to the contractor that was supposed to provide the custom glass panels going bankrupt.

Red Line trains were later forced to single track between Friendship Heights and Van Ness due to another arcing insulator failure.

References

External links

 Q Street entrance from Google Maps Street View
 19th Street entrance from Google Maps Street View

Washington Metro
Stations on the Red Line (Washington Metro)
Washington Metro stations in Washington, D.C.
Railway stations in the United States opened in 1977
1977 establishments in Washington, D.C.
Railway stations located underground in Washington, D.C.